Yɛmba or Yemba, also Yémba or Bamiléké Dschang, is a major Bamileke language of Cameroon. It was spoken by 300,000 or so people in the West Region in 1992.

Despite originally being exclusively a spoken language, Yemba writing was developed by Maurice Tadadjeu (co-creator of the General Alphabet of Cameroon Languages) and Steven Bird. Their team developed a small Yemba - French Dictionary covering French translations of over 3,000 Yemba words and expressions. The Yemba alphabet is a subset of the International Phonetic Alphabet.

A machine backwards transformation of the dictionary was performed by independent scientists who created the French translation of Yemba words. The resulting dictionary was extended with French synonyms from the French version of the WordNet database. Furthermore, over 6,000 English, German, Czech, Spanish, Italian and Chinese words and expressions were translated into Yemba. A major outcome of this project is a collaborative online platform for extending Yemba translations and promoting the learning of the Yemba language.

Phonology

Consonants 

 Sounds /t͡ʃ ʃ ʒ/ are included as phonemes in some analyses. In most analyses, they are considered as allophones of /t͡s s z/.
 Sounds [p l ɣ] are consonant alternation sounds between the following consonants /b d ɡ/.
 Alternation sounds of /j w/ are labialized and palatalized sounds [ɡʲ ɡʷ].
 Graphemes of the alterations and allophones [t͡ʃ ʃ ʒ p l] are noted in the Yemba alphabet as c sh j p l.
An /r/ sound can also be included in the current language, and written in the Yemba alphabet as r.
 The prosodies if palatalization and labialization [ʲ ʷ], are written orthographically with lowercase graphemes y w. 
A grapheme for aspiration [ʰ] among consonants is written as h.

Vowels 

 /ʉ/ is included as a phoneme in some analyses. In more abstract analyses, it is considered as a palatalization of /u/.
 Vowel length is distinguished using double vowel sounds (ex. aa [aː])

Tone 
Three tones are marked as high [á], mid [ā], or low [à]. Low tones are unmarked when written.

References

Petit dictionnaire Yemba Francais

External links
Aleco Yemba.net - Online Dictionaries and Learning Tools for the Yemba Language

Languages of Cameroon
Bamileke languages